Goldlochspitz is a mountain in Liechtenstein in the Rätikon range of the Eastern Alps with a height of .

References
 

Mountains of the Alps
Mountains of Liechtenstein